Kenneth Brylle Larsen (born 22 May 1959) is a Danish former professional footballer. He scored two goals in 16 matches for the Denmark national team and represented his country at the 1984 European Championship.

Biography
Born in Copenhagen, Brylle started playing football with local club Frederiksberg Boldklub (FB). He played for Hvidovre IF in the secondary Danish 2nd Division, and helped the club win promotion for the top-flight Danish 1st Division in the 1978 season. Before the start of the 1979 season, he moved to 1st Division rivals Vejle Boldklub, where he got his national breakthrough. He scored 18 goals in 26 league games, before moving abroad to play professionally for Belgian club RSC Anderlecht in 1979. He stayed five years at Anderlecht, with whom he won the 1983 UEFA Cup, scoring the only goal in the final.

He moved to Dutch team PSV Eindhoven in 1984 and on to Olympique Marseille in France in 1985. In 1986, he moved back to Belgium to play for Club Brugge. He played a total of 101 matches and scored 49 goals for Club Brugge, with whom he won the 1988 Jupiler League championship. He went on to play for Belgian clubs Beerschot, Lierse S.K. and FC Knokke.

He became a FIFA-certified coach, and coached lower league clubs such as FC Knokke, KV Oostende, Eendracht Aalter, White Star Lauwe and Wielsbeke in Belgium. He later managed Danish side Hvidovre IF from 1 January 2009 until 31 December 2010. He has changed his nationality to Belgian.

Honours

Player 

 RSC Anderlecht

 Belgian First Division: 1980–81
 UEFA Cup: 1982–83 (winners), 1983-84 (runners-up)
 Jules Pappaert Cup: 1983

Club Brugge 

 Belgian First Division: 1987–88
 Belgian Super Cup: 1986, 1988

Olympique Marseille 

 French Cup: 1985-86 (runners-up)

Individual 

 UEFA Cup Top Scorer: 1987–88 (6 goals)

References

External links
Kenneth Brylle at The Danish Football Association 
Kenneth Brylle at Voetbal International 
Kenneth Brylle at om1899.com 

Kenneth Brylle career statistics

1959 births
Living people
Danish men's footballers
Denmark international footballers
Denmark under-21 international footballers
Denmark youth international footballers
Footballers from Copenhagen
Hvidovre IF players
Vejle Boldklub players
R.S.C. Anderlecht players
PSV Eindhoven players
Olympique de Marseille players
Club Brugge KV players
CE Sabadell FC footballers
Lierse S.K. players
K. Beerschot V.A.C. players
Eredivisie players
Ligue 1 players
La Liga players
Belgian Pro League players
Danish expatriate sportspeople in Belgium
Danish expatriate sportspeople in France
Danish expatriate sportspeople in the Netherlands
Danish expatriate sportspeople in Spain
Danish expatriate men's footballers
Expatriate footballers in France
Expatriate footballers in the Netherlands
Expatriate footballers in Belgium
Expatriate footballers in Spain
UEFA Euro 1984 players
Danish football managers
K.V. Oostende managers
Association football forwards
UEFA Cup winning players